Carla Calò (21 September 1926 – 29 December 2019) was an Italian actress.

Life and career 
Born in Palermo, Calò started her career on stage, notably starring in Luigi Squarzina's Il berretto a sonagli, and also being active in dialectal theatre and avanspettacolo. She made her film debut in 1949, in Carlo Ludovico Bragaglia's Il falco rosso. During the early part of her film career Calò played several main roles, then, from the second half of the 1950s, she became one of the most active character actresses in Italian cinema. She was sometimes credited as Carrol Brown.

Calò died in December 2019 at the age of 93.

Selected filmography
 
 Il falco rosso (1949) - Marfa
 Totò Le Mokò (1949) - Suleima
 The Iron Swordsman (1949) - Haidée
 The Fighting Men (1950) - Rosa
 The Treasure of Bengal (1953) - Surama
 La pattuglia dell'Amba Alagi (1953) - Elena
 Mystery of the Black Jungle (1954) - Sulima
 La vendetta dei Tughs (1954) - Sulima
 Madonna delle rose (1954)
 Il cantante misterioso (1955) - Olga
 Suonno d'ammore (1955) - Carmen De Blasi
 Sultana Safiyè (1955)
 La ladra (1955) - Gemma
 Una sera di maggio (1955) - His Secretary
 Vendicata! (1956)
 Il canto dell'emigrante (1956)
 Cantando sotto le stelle (1956) - Moglie di A. Pezzetti 2°
 Sette canzoni per sette sorelle (1957) - Signorina Paoletti
 La canzone più bella (1957)
 A vent'anni è sempre festa (1957)
 Il romanzo di un giovane povero (1958)
 Captain Falcon (1958) - Teresa
 Ritrovarsi all'alba (1959)
 Quel tesoro di papà (1959) - Adelaide
 Goliath and the Barbarians (1959) - Bruno's Mother
 Due selvaggi a corte (1959)
 Agosto, donne mie non vi conosco (1959)
 Spavaldi e innamorati (1959)
 Goliath and the Dragon (1960) - La Sibilla
 Fury of the Pagans (1960)
 The Last of the Vikings (1961) - Herta
 Spade senza bandiera (1961)
 Revolt of the Mercenaries (1961) - Miriam du Marchant
 5 marines per 100 ragazze (1961) - Una professoressa
 Triumph of the Son of Hercules (1961) - Yalis - the Oracle
 Revenge of the Conquered (1961)
 Gerarchi si muore (1961) - Tatiana Merletti
 Gli anni ruggenti (1962)
 Zorro alla corte di Spagna (1962) - Francisca Di Villa Verde
 Caesar the Conqueror (1962) - Calpurnia
 Musketeers of the Sea (1962) - Zalamea
 Roaring Years (1962) - Bibiana
 Avventura al motel (1963) - Elvira
 The Eye of the Needle (1963) - Elisabetta
 The Magnificent Adventurer (1963) - Zia di Angela
 Il terrore dei mantelli rossi (1963)
 Brennus, Enemy of Rome (1963) - High Priestess
 D'Artagnan contro i 3 moschettieri (1963)
 Bebo's Girl (1964) - Mara's Mother
 FBI chiama Istanbul (1964) - Laura Basento
 Hercules the Invincible (1964) - Queen Etel
 Terror in the Crypt (1964) - Ljuba's Mother
 Le sette vipere (Il marito latino) (1964)
 00-2 agenti segretissimi (1964) - Russian Spy Chief
 Ali Baba and the Seven Saracens (1964) - Farida, Omar's lover
 Bullets and the Flesh (1964) - Master's Maid
 I magnifici brutos del West (1964)
 Vengeance of the Vikings (1965) - Freiodis - Erik's Mother
 Secret Agent Fireball (1965) - Jane Cartland
 Veneri in collegio (1965)
 The Double Bed (1965) - Mother
 Operation Poker (1965) - Russian Agent
 The Tramplers (1965) - Mrs. Temple Cordeen
 Mondo pazzo... gente matta! (1966) - Butcher's Wife
 Agent 505: Death Trap in Beirut (1966) - Boss
 Killer's Carnival (1966) - Female boss (Rome segment) 
 L'affare Beckett (1966) - Nadia
 One Thousand Dollars on the Black (1966) - Rhonda
 Hello Glen Ward, House Dick (1968) - Mrs. Parker
 Better a Widow (1968) - Rosa's governess
 The Seven Red Berets (1969)
 Taste of Vengeance (1969) - Mother Douglas
 Poppea's Hot Nights (1969) - Calpurnia
 Erika (1971) - Concettina
 No Way Out (1973) - Arzenta's Mother
 Anna, quel particolare piacere (1973) - Anna's mother
 La cameriera (1974) - Rosalia / Don Gaetano's wife
 Salvo D'Acquisto (1974) - Laundress
 La encadenada (1975) - Mother Superior
 Una vergine in famiglia (1975) - Francesca Vicini
 The Flower in His Mouth (1975)
 Calore in provincia (1975) - Nena
 La campagnola bella (1976)
 La cameriera nera (1976) - Eleonora
 Submission (1976) - Carmen
 La sorprendente eredità del tontodimammà (1977)
 Verso sera (1990)
 Io e il re (1995)
 Voglio stare sotto al letto (1999)

References

External links 
 

1926 births
2019 deaths
20th-century Italian actresses
Actresses from Palermo
Italian film actresses
Italian stage actresses
Italian television actresses